Neely Elementary School, also known as Neely School Building, is a historic school building located at St. Joseph, Missouri.  The building was originally constructed in 1871, with its earliest extant portions to date from 1894. Additions and major renovations were completed in 1909 and 1916. The school is a two-story brick and limestone building on a raised basement with Classical Revival style design elements.  Some of the modifications were designed by architect Edmond Jacques Eckel (1845–1934).

It was listed on the National Register of Historic Places in 2014.

References

School buildings on the National Register of Historic Places in Missouri
Neoclassical architecture in Missouri
School buildings completed in 1909
Buildings and structures in St. Joseph, Missouri
National Register of Historic Places in Buchanan County, Missouri
1909 establishments in Missouri